Thomas Rau (born 6 April 1984) is a German Paralympic table tennis player. He won bronze in the Men's team class 6–7 at the 2020 Summer Paralympics in Tokyo. He is a European champion and a World bronze medalist. He was born without a right arm and has missing fingers on his left hand.

References

External links
 Thomas Rau at ITTF Para Table Tennis
 
 

1984 births
Living people
German male table tennis players
Paralympic table tennis players of Germany
Paralympic bronze medalists for Germany
Table tennis players at the 2012 Summer Paralympics
Table tennis players at the 2016 Summer Paralympics
Table tennis players at the 2020 Summer Paralympics
Medalists at the 2020 Summer Paralympics
People from Ostholstein
Sportspeople from Schleswig-Holstein